Avalon, also known as Otherworld, is a fictional dimension appearing in American comic books published by Marvel Comics. It is based on the mythical Avalon from Celtic and, more specifically, Welsh mythology.

Avalon first appeared in Fantastic Four #54 (September 1966) by Stan Lee and Jack Kirby. Avalon's dimension was referred to as 'Otherworld' for the first time in Captain Britain #1 (October 1976) by Chris Claremont, Herb Trimpe, and Fred Kida.

General description
Avalon is a small other-dimensional planetary body located in a pocket dimension adjacent to Earth. It is formed by the collective subconscious of the inhabitants of the United Kingdom and the Republic of Ireland. The dimension of Avalon is also known as Otherworld. However, the island of Avalon within this dimension is actually only a small part of the larger dimension that is Otherworld. Other places within this dimension include Fomor (home of the Fomorians), Annwn (home of the dead), and other locales associated with Celtic mythology. Notably, this pocket dimension also contains the Starlight Citadel, home of the fictional otherworld being, Roma, and the base of the Captain Britain Corps.

Otherworld is a high fantasy world; gods, elves, dragons, and many other beings live in small towns and large castles with no heavy industry. Large forests and bright lakes separate the several islands and locations from one another. Sorcery and magic are a part of daily life, although the Captain Britain Corps and Avalon also possess highly advanced technology.

History

Within the fictional historical setting of Avalon, there previously existed many ways to travel from Earth to Avalon and back during ancient times, which was created by characters in the setting known as the Twelve Walkers. Six of the Twelve Walkers, depicted within the story as evil, then created false paths that would lead travellers to dangerous places or drive them to the point of insanity, which resulted in a backlash from the human inhabitants of Earth against all magical creatures. It is described within the comics at this point much of the magical creatures relocated to Avalon, and having left most of the paths between Earth and Avalon destroyed, with only a few remaining functional.

After the death of King Arthur, his body was taken to Avalon by Merlin. The city of Camelot was also taken to Avalon including all of the Knights of the Round Table, the process through which it was taken to Avalon was unclear.

Merlyn, Roma and the Starlight Citadel
Merlyn created the Starlight Citadel, located on a different island than Avalon. From the Starlight Citadel he founded the Captain Britain Corps, a group of superhuman heroes who would patrol the countless Earths in the Omniverse. Merlyn became the Omniversal Guardian and was assisted in his task by the Omniversal Majestor/Majestrix. His task was to safeguard the Omniverse against any threats and the technology Merlyn provided was capable of destroying entire universes that posed a serious danger. When Mad Jim Jaspers appeared, Merlyn faked his death and was replaced by Roma as Omniversal Guardian. Saturnyne became the Omniversal Majestrix.

Years later, Mastermind conquered the island of the Starlight Citadel, destroyed most of the Captain Britain Corps and disguised himself as Roma. Mastermind wanted the Amulet of Right and the Sword of Might, two mystical artifacts which had once empowered Brian Braddock, also known as Captain Britain and his enemy Joshua Stragg, the Reaver. Braddock found the artifacts before Mastermind, and discovered that he was the rightful heir to them. Through the use of those artifacts, he was able to defeat Mastermind, and Roma named him the new ruler of Avalon, while she remained as his advisor. Brian recently left his throne after the events in House of M and returned to Earth.

The island of Avalon and the Celtic Gods
On the island of Avalon, home to the Celtic Gods also known as the Tuatha da Danaan, druids would forge the magical artifact known as the Evil Eye. The Eye was given to Prester John, who travelled back to Earth with it. The Celtic Gods themselves would have an endless war with the Fomorians, who would try to invade Avalon repeatedly. The Celtic Gods would receive assistance from Thor in repelling several invasions.

One of the Celtic Gods, the Lady of the Lake, safeguarded Excalibur, King Arthur's sword. She became a close ally of the Black Knight and even gave him Excalibur when he lost his weapon, the Ebony Blade. Years later, the Lady of the Lake gave the Black Knight his new weapons: the Sword of Light and the Shield of Night. In return the Black Knight became her protector. The Black Knight would often travel between Earth and Avalon and seek the Lady of the Lake for advice.

Avalon is also the home of the Green Knight, a primordial nature spirit. From the Green Chapel he empowers select warriors as his Pendragons to battle the servants of the Red Lord and his followers; known as the Bane. Pendragons of the past include Arthur, Merlin & the Knights of the Round Table, Robin Hood and the Merry Men, the World War I superhero Albion, detective Dai Thomas, Captain Britain, Union Jack, and others.

The Lady of the Lake called Black Knight "The new Pendragon" when she gave him the Sword of Light and Shield of Night, it is unclear if Dane was tapping into the same mystical power that empowered the other Pendragon Knights.

The Green Knight's Pendragons support nature, creation, and life; while the Bane champion decay, destruction, and death. The Red Lord operates from a hell-realm called Anwyn.

During the Secret Invasion storyline, the Skrulls invaded Avalon where they seemingly destroy the Lady of the Lake and the Green Knight. Pete Wisdom later used the shard to free Merlin from his imprisonment who managed to revive Captain Britain. When Merlin gave Captain Britain Excalibur, he used it to end the Skrull's invasion of Britain. Pete Wisdom later restored the Lady of the Lake and the Green Knight to life.

During the Chaos War storyline, Amatsu-Mikaboshi led an army of enslaved alien gods in an invasion of Avalon, where they defeated King Arthur and his allies.  However, Avalon was restored by the Greek god Hercules after he used his newly-enhanced powers to trap Amatsu-Mikaboshi in a pocket dimension.

The Manchester Gods
A druid by the name of Master Wilson spontaneously materialized in the north of the Otherworld as a personification of the industrialization and urbanization of present-day Britain. He held the belief that the monarchies that predominated the Otherworld for centuries were unjust for the townsfolk, and that it was time for Avalon to urbanize and modernize so that it could more accurately reflect the collective subconscious of present-day Britain. To achieve this, Master Wilson struck a deal with the fire demon Surtur of Muspelheim, whereby Surtur provided Master Wilson with the raw power to construct massive mechanized cities known as the "Manchester Gods" to wage war upon Merlyn, Captain Britain, the Tuatha da Dannan, Pendragon's Court, and the other ruling elite of Avalon. Within the comics, following a destructive war, Master Wilson and the Manchester Gods forced the leaders of Avalon to sign an armistice and surrender, thereby establishing a parliamentary democracy.

However, when Surtur later assaulted the Nine Realms of Asgard using the technology of the Manchester Gods, the Asgardians Thor and Loki travelled to Otherworld and confronted Master Wilson, who was depicted as being regretful of having unwittingly helped Surtur and subsequently sacrificed himself and the Manchester Gods to stop Surtur's plan in the Nine Realms.

Notable inhabitants

Individuals
 Captain Britain and Meggan: When Brian Braddock became ruler of Otherworld, he relocated together with Meggan to live on Otherworld. After Meggan's disappearance during House of M, Brian returned to his homeworld Earth-616.
 Green Knight: Lord Bercilak de Hautdesert is the Green Knight of unknown origin.
 King Arthur: The ruler of Camelot.
 The Lady of the Lake: A Celtic goddess who lives both on Camelot and on Earth at the same time.
 Merlin: The wizard who was an ally of King Arthur.
 Merlyn: Former Omniversal Guardian who posed as the Merlin of legend. His current location is unknown, but he often visits his daughter, Roma.
 Roma: Omniversal Guardian, current leader of Otherworld.
 Opal Luna Saturnyne: Omniversal Majestrix, servant of Roma and former inhabitant of Earth 9.

Groups
 The Captain Britain Corps is based on Otherworld, though most Captain Britains live on their own Earth and only come to Otherworld for meetings.
 The Celtic Gods of Marvel Comics live on the island of Avalon, including Leir.
 The Knights of Pendragon of Marvel Comics were transported together with Camelot to the island of Avalon.

Other versions
 In Avataars: Covenant of the Shield, Eurth's Avalon is a kingdom that is ruled by Captain Avalon and protected by the Champions of the Realm.

Notes
 The Evil Eye played an important role in the Avengers/Defenders-crossover. Prester John has travelled to Cable's island Providence, seeing it as a modern-day equivalent of Avalon.
 The Sword of Right was stated to be the same sword as Excalibur in Excalibur: Sword of Power, but this seems to contradict Marvel History.

See also
 Multiverse (Marvel Comics)

References

External links
 Appendix to The Marvel Universe Otherworld/Avalon

Arthurian comics
Fictional elements introduced in 1966